The Cork Run Tunnel, also known as the Berry Street Tunnel, is one of nine tunnels built in Pittsburgh, Pennsylvania on the original Pittsburgh and Steubenville Railroad. A shaft was sunk from the overlying ridge to a point near the midpoint of the tunnel to speed construction and to provide ventilation. Work was suspended in 1856 due to financial troubles, and resumed in 1862. The tunnel was completed in 1865.

Immediately upon completion it was apparent that the tunnel needed two lines. The tunnel was widened starting in 1870 for two tracks, and was completed in 1873. Nevertheless, the tunnel continued to represent a bottleneck, since large cars could not pass each other without causing derailments, which happened frequently.  By 1889 work began on the Ohio Connecting Railway to relieve the tunnel. At the same time, the Cork's Run valley was filled in to build the Sheraden Yards, feeding the Cork Run Tunnel.

By 1906 the tunnel lining had deteriorated, becoming unstable and requiring almost continuous repair. Since the tunnel was so narrow, workers had to take shelter as trains passed. At least one fatal work accident happened, and several cave-ins closed the tunnel. Around 1900 a  section of the tunnel was cut open to the sky at the Pittsburgh end. By 1947 the Cork Run Tunnel was the only tunnel in the railroad's Panhandle Division that had not been fully "daylighted," cut open to the sky along its entire length.

The tunnel was refurbished and re-opened in 1995 to serve as the link between Pittsburgh's Sheraden neighborhood and the community of Ingram on the Port Authority of Allegheny County's West Busway.

References

External links

 Berry Street Tunnel at Pghbridges.com

Railroad tunnels in Pennsylvania
Tunnels completed in 1865
Historic American Engineering Record in Pennsylvania
1865 establishments in Pennsylvania